Philip Charles Snyder (born February 6, 1953) is an American university professor, voice actor, stand-up comedian, author, animator, musician, singer-songwriter, director, screenwriter and producer.

Career
He was born the sixth child in a family of ten children. He began to demonstrate his love for, and natural skills in entertainment, especially impressions, at an early age. Snyder moved to Los Angeles, California, in 1974 to pursue a career in show business. After a few false starts, he became a regular paid performer at The Comedy Store. He began pursuing a career in voice-overs for animated cartoons and commercials.
In 1996, Snyder had his first guest role in an animated TV series as Newt Gingrich and "Bob" in an episode of Steven Spielberg's Pinky and the Brain.  The episode title was "The Pink Candidate".

In 1998, Snyder starred in his first feature film as Mr. Toad in the American version of Martin Gates's The Wind in the Willows. Snyder also played the villain, Thaddeus J. Pinchworm, in The Wacky Adventures of Ronald McDonald, which was animated by Klasky Csupo.

In May 2010, Snyder began to voice the Disney character, Jiminy Cricket. His first appearance as him was in the popular video game series, Kingdom Hearts. He took over the role from Eddie Carroll, who died in April 2010.

He is also the voice of the Mattel Toys interactive talking toy, "Stinky the Garbage Truck," which made its debut in 2010.

Snyder began teaching at the University of Houston in their College of Technology's Digital Media Program in 2013, and won their Teaching Excellence Award in 2015.

Filmography

Film

Television

Video games

Theme parks

Commercials and promos
 Disney Christmas Ad: Jiminy Cricket (Disney Home Video)
 Stinky Garbage Truck Ad: Stinky (Young & Rubicam/Mattel)
 Tropicana Orange Juice: Orange (Pepsico/Element 79)
 7-Eleven Stores: Cartoon Man (Richards Group/PBS)
 Popeye’s Chicken: Popeye, Olive, Whimpy (Hill, Holiday Altschiller)
 Premier Parks: Popeye, Olive, Bluto (Ackerman McQueen)
 Toys ‘r’ Us: Tough Guy, Crazy Guy (Wells Rich Greene)
 Blockbuster Video: Octopus (Bernstein-Rein)

Television and episodic webisodes
 Ad It Up: Just Ad Milk (Pilot): Writer/Producer/Director (KAZAP Corp.)
 The Numbears: All Roles (8 Million YouTube Views) (KAZAP Corp.)
 24—online Animated: George Mason (Imagine Ent.)
 Something So Right: Hector the Stuttering Parrot (Universal/NBC)

Radio, commercials, and talk shows
 Discover Card: Elf (Shine Adv/DG Entertainment)
 Quik Trip: Dad (Richards Group)
 Jc Penney: Crazy Announcer (Ackerman McQueen)
 Boatman’s Bank: 3rd Little Pig (TBWA Kerlick Switzer)
 Infincom Copiers: Dudley Doo-Right, Snidley (Moses Anshell)
 Rick Dees Top 40: Featured (Syndicated)

Comedy clubs and live concerts
 Comedy Stores of Hollywood, Las Vegas, La Jolla, & Universal City, Atlantis Hotel in Atlantic City (Jeff Kutash's "Superstars & Stripes") Also regular at Ice House, Laff Stop, Igby’s, Coconuts, Laugh Factory, and Los Angeles area comedy clubs. Toured with World Champion gymnast, Kurt Thomas's "Gymnastics America" as MC/Host.

Education
Electronics (A.S.) – Los Angeles Valley College 1985
Advanced Biblical Studies (Diploma) – Liberty University 1990
Cinema & Television Arts – Multimedia Production (B.A.) – California State University Northridge 2009
Master of Fine Arts, Television/Film/Theatre (M.F.A.) – California State University Los Angeles 2012

Notes

References

External links

Phil Snyder at Voice Chasers

1953 births
American male voice actors
American male video game actors
American male comedians
American male screenwriters
American male musicians
American male singers
American animators
California State University, Los Angeles alumni
California State University, Northridge alumni
Educators from California
Liberty University alumni
Living people
Male actors from Los Angeles
Male actors from Washington (state)
Los Angeles Valley College people
People from Ellensburg, Washington
University of Houston faculty